XProc is a W3C Recommendation to define an XML transformation language to define XML Pipelines.

Below is an example abbreviated XProc file:
<p:pipeline name="pipeline" xmlns:p="http://www.w3.org/ns/xproc" version="1.0">
  <p:input port="schemas" sequence="true"/>

  <p:xinclude/>

  <p:validate-with-xml-schema>
    <p:input port="schema">
      <p:pipe step="pipeline" port="schemas"/>
    </p:input>
  </p:validate-with-xml-schema>
</p:pipeline>

This is a pipeline that consists of two atomic steps, XInclude and Validate. The pipeline itself has three inputs, “source” (a source document), “schemas” (a list of W3C XML Schemas) and  “parameters” (for passing parameters). The XInclude step reads the pipeline input “source” and produces a result document. The Validate step reads the pipeline input “schemas” and the output from the XInclude step and produces a result document. The result of the validation, “result”, is the result of the pipeline.

Here is an equivalent less abbreviated XProc pipeline:
<p:pipeline name="pipeline" xmlns:p="http://www.w3.org/ns/xproc" 
  version="1.0">
  <p:input port="schemas" sequence="true"/>

  <p:xinclude name="included">
    <p:input port="source">
      <p:pipe step="pipeline" port="source"/>
    </p:input>
  </p:xinclude>

  <p:validate-with-xml-schema name="validated">
    <p:input port="source">
      <p:pipe step="included" port="result"/>
    </p:input>
    <p:input port="schema">
      <p:pipe step="pipeline" port="schemas"/>
    </p:input>
  </p:validate-with-xml-schema>
</p:pipeline>

Implementations 
 Calabash maintained by Norman Walsh
 Calumet, EMC’s XProc implementation
 MorganaXProc, developed by <xml-project />
 QuiXProc, Innovimax's (GPL) version in Java implementing Streaming and Parallel processing
 Tubular (LGPL) maintained by Herve Quiroz
 xprocxq, XQuery old implementation on top of eXist
 xproc.xq, XQuery implementation on top of MarkLogic

See also 
 XSLT
 XPath

External links 
 The XML Processing Model Working Group page at W3C
 The W3C Recommendation
 The web site maintained by Norman Walsh
 XProc tutorial
 XProc reference

References

World Wide Web Consortium standards
XML-based standards
XML-based programming languages
Markup languages
Declarative programming languages
Concurrent programming languages
Domain-specific programming languages